The Castle of Muro Lucano is a castle in the commune of Muro Lucano in the Potenza province of the Basilicata region of southern Italy. It was originally built in the 9th century and parts of it are still inhabited by the Martuscelli family, relatives of Francesco Domenico Lordi who bought the castle in 1830.

History 
 9th century - originally built by the Lombards
 10th century - expanded by the Angiou rulers
 1382 - Queen of Naples, Joanna I, died at the castle allegedly assassinated by order of the King of Naples, Charles III 
 1435 - End of occupation by the Aragonese 
 1530 - enfeoffed to Ferdinando Orsini, Duke of Gravina 
 1617 - described as "characterized by two powerful towers and a narrow drawbridge" 
 1694 - damaged by an earthquake after which new parts we added and the drawbridge removed 
 1806 - the feoffment to Orsini family ended with the end of feudalism
 1830 - sold to Francesco Domenico Lordi by Bernualdo III 
 1980 - damaged by an earthquake after which major rebuilding work took place

References 

Castles in Basilicata
Joanna I of Naples